Union Sport Club Landhaus Wien is an Austrian women's football club from Vienna. Founded in 1968, four years later it was a founding member of the ÖFB-Frauenliga, where it has played since – it has never been relegated. Landhaus won 12 championships and 11 national cups between 1973 and 2002, which makes it the most successful club in both competitions. In 2001 it was the first Austrian team to take part in the newly founded in the UEFA Women's Cup, losing all three group stage matches.

2019–20 squad

Honours

Titles
 Austrian League (12)
 1974, 1976, 1978, 1981, 1982, 1983, 1988, 1989, 1995, 1997, 2000, 2001
 Austrian Cup (11)
 1973, 1975, 1976, 1980, 1986, 1987, 1988, 1997, 2000, 2001, 2002
 Austrian Supercup (1)
 2002

Competition record

UEFA competition record

References

External links
Club's website

Women's football clubs in Austria
1968 establishments in Austria